Governor Carney may refer to:

John Carney (Delaware politician) (born 1956), 74th Governor of Delaware
Thomas Carney (1824–1888), 2nd Governor of Kansas